The 2021 ICC Women's T20 World Cup Europe Qualifier was a cricket tournament that was played in August 2021 in Spain. The matches were played as Women's Twenty20 Internationals (WT20Is), with the top team progressing to the 2022 ICC Women's T20 World Cup Qualifier tournament. Originally scheduled to take place in Scotland, the tournament was moved to the La Manga Club, Spain, due to the COVID-19 pandemic.

France and Turkey were both scheduled to make their debuts at an ICC women's event. However, on 25 August 2021, the International Cricket Council (ICC) confirmed that Turkey had withdrawn from the tournament, as they were unable to get approval to travel from the Turkish Sports Ministry.

On the opening day of the tournament, Dutch cricketer Frederique Overdijk became the first bowler, male or female, to take seven wickets in a T20I match. Scotland won the tournament, winning all four of their matches, and progressed to the Women's World Twenty20 Qualifier tournament. Ireland finished in second place, after beating the Netherlands in their final match, with Ireland's Eimear Richardson being named the player of the tournament. Ireland may still advance to the Women's World Twenty20 Qualifier tournament via the place available to the highest ranked non-qualified team.

During the tournament, questions were raised about the quality of the pitch at La Manga. This resulted in the ICC moving the European 2022 Under-19 Cricket World Cup qualification matches from La Manga to the Desert Springs Cricket Ground in Almeria.

Squads
The following teams and squads were named for the tournament:

On 23 August 2021, Shauna Kavanagh was ruled out of Ireland's squad following a positive test for COVID-19. Amy Hunter was named as her replacement.

Points table

 advanced to the global qualifier

Fixtures
The fixtures for the Europe Qualifier were confirmed on 16 August 2021.

References

External links
 Series home at ESPN Cricinfo

 
2021 in women's cricket
Associate international cricket competitions in 2021
ICC